Radio HIT Brčko or Radio Hit is a Bosnian local commercial radio station, broadcasting from Brčko, Bosnia and Herzegovina. This radio station broadcasts a variety of programs such as folk, pop and rock music mix, as well as author's shows and news program.

Radio station is founded in 1997 by the company HIT d.o.o. Brčko which also operate TV HIT Brčko.

Program is mainly produced in Serbian language at two FM frequencies and it is available in the Brčko District, Posavina Canton and Semberija area as well as in nearby municipalities in Croatia.

Estimated number of listeners of Radio Hit is around 342.542.

Frequencies
 Majevica  
 Doboj

See also 
 List of radio stations in Bosnia and Herzegovina
 Radio Brčko
 BH Radio 1
 Radio postaja Odžak
 Radiopostaja Orašje
 Radio Preporod
 Obiteljski Radio Valentino

References

External links 
 www.rtvhit.com
 www.radiostanica.ba
 www.fmscan.org
 Communications Regulatory Agency of Bosnia and Herzegovina

Brčko
Radio stations established in 1997
Brčko District